Ahmed Al-Mubarak (born 31 March 1985) is a football (soccer) player who plays as a winger.

External links 
 

Living people
People from Al-Hasa
Association football midfielders
Saudi Arabian footballers
1985 births
Al Nassr FC players
Ettifaq FC players
Khaleej FC players
Al-Fateh SC players
Al-Adalah FC players
Al-Nojoom FC players
Saudi First Division League players
Saudi Professional League players
Saudi Second Division players
Saudi Arabian Shia Muslims